Monsterhearts is a role-playing game about "the messy lives of teenage monsters", developed from Apocalypse World. It is known for its handling of sexuality and LGBT content. It has been nominated or shortlisted for five awards.

Setting

Monsterhearts is set in a fictional high school that along with the surrounding environment is named and fleshed out by all players during character creation. In order to start creating the setting, each player first picks a character class (called a "skin"), with each skin being both a type of monster and a metaphor for the struggles of a teenager. As a part of the character creation process and by using the elements provided as a part of their skins, the players define their characters' relationships with each other and with other elements of the setting.

Then the homeroom for their high school class is drawn, with the players filling in where their characters sit. The GM (known in Monsterhearts as the MC) then fills in some of the rest, leaving blanks for further exploration. At the end of character creation the characters will all have "strings" on each other that can be spent to manipulate, and more can be gained in the course of play.

Skins

Each skin comes with a collection of "Moves" or special abilities, (every skin starting with either two or three), a default "Darkest Self" that indicates what happens when things go really wrong, and a "Sex Move" that indicates what happens when that character has sex with another. In addition to the default skins found in the rulebook, each edition has additional skins available from the developer or third parties, and advice for modifying skins or creating new ones.

The default skins in Monsterhearts are the Fae, the Ghost, the Ghoul, the Infernal, the Mortal, the Queen, the Vampire, the Werewolf, and the Witch, with first edition adding the Chosen and second edition the Hollow.

Sexuality and queer content

In Monsterhearts any PC may roll to turn any other character on, and all the characters have a sex move (as indicated above). This is explicitly because as a teenager you don't get to choose what turns you on, and because "Monsterhearts is a game about the confusion that arises when your body and your social world start changing without your permission." It also, because of this, has a two page spread dedicated to using Monsterhearts to explore queer content.

This approach to sexuality has drawn comment, with Bitch Magazine commenting, "Indeed, nearly every rule related to sex and sexuality in Monsterhearts is a game manifestation of real-life sexual dynamics, good and bad, healthy and unhealthy. Instead of the rote, heterosexist portrayals of sex and sexuality you might find in other games, Monsterhearts gleefully encourages people of all identities to explore sexuality in every permutation, often with great self-examination and as uncomfortably as possible. But for a game with such a depth of emotional/sexual content, it's remarkably free of sexism. It also doesn't slut-shame, or enforce traditional gendered tropes of judgment about sexual behavior."

Gameplay

Monsterhearts uses the Powered by the Apocalypse engine created for Apocalypse World and also used in Dungeon World. Whenever a player has declared that they are doing something challenging and risky, the MC asks them to roll 2d6 and add their relevant statistic to perform the relevant move. On a 10+ they succeed, on a 7–9 they succeed but have to take a partial success, or make a hard choice, and on a 6 or less the MC gets to make a Hard Move representing something going badly wrong.

Strings against specific characters are gained through moves, and through turning people on – and may be spent either for a bonus to a dice roll after rolling, to inflict a condition on the target, or to offer them an XP to do something the offering player suggests. Like Apocalypse World, XP is also gained by moves or by using one of two statistics: the one the person with the greatest hold over your character (counted in strings) nominated at the start of the session, and the one the MC nominated.

Requirements to play
 3–5 players (one to play the MC)
 Two ordinary six-sided dice each
 A different "skin" for each player
 Quick reference sheets
 However many sessions the players find fun

Statistics and moves

The statistics in Monsterhearts are Hot, Cold, Volatile, and Dark. Hot can be used to "turn someone on" or (in the first edition) "manipulate an NPC", cold to "shut someone down" or to keep one's nerve and "hold steady", volatile to "lash out physically" or run away", and dark to "Gaze Into The Abyss" and for most skin-specific magical functions.

History

Monsterhearts started out as a joke game, using Apocalypse World to run Twilight, although Jennifer's Body and Ginger Snaps are cited as inspirations the designer prefers. The initial playtest of Monsterhearts started in 2010, the same year Apocalypse World was produced. Playtesting took most of 2011, with the first edition being launched through Indiegogo in January and February 2012. It was released to critical acclaim, and was nominated for every major RPG award except the ENnies. A second edition was released in 2017.

Award nominations

Monsterhearts was runner-up for the 2012 Indie RPG Awards for Best Support, and Game of the Year, and was shortlisted for the 2012 Golden Geek RPG of the Year, the Lucca Comics & Games Best Role-Playing Game, and the 2013 Origins Awards Best Roleplaying Game.

References

Indie role-playing games
Role-playing games introduced in 2012